The ten-story Fine Arts Building, formerly known as the Studebaker Building, is located at 410 S Michigan Avenue across from Grant Park in Chicago in the Chicago Landmark Historic Michigan Boulevard District. It was built for the Studebaker company in 1884–1885 by Solon Spencer Beman, and extensively remodeled in 1898, when Beman removed the building's eighth (then the top) story and added three new stories, extending the building to its current height. Studebaker constructed the building as a carriage sales and service operation with manufacturing on upper floors. The interior features Art Nouveau motifs and murals by artists such as Martha Susan Baker, Frederic Clay Bartlett, Oliver Dennett Grover, Frank Xavier Leyendecker, and Bertha Sophia Menzler-Peyton dating from the 1898 renovation. In the early 20th century, the Kalo Shop and Wilro Shop, firms owned by women and specializing in Arts and Crafts items, were established in the Fine Arts Building.

Currently, true to its name, it houses artists' lofts, art galleries, theatre, dance and recording studios, interior and web design firms, musical instrument makers, and other businesses associated with the arts. It also holds offices of the Chicago Youth Symphony, the Jazz Institute of Chicago, and the Chicago International Puppet Theater Festival. The Fine Arts Building was designated a Chicago Landmark on June 7, 1978.

Studebaker Theater

The Fine Arts Building houses the Studebaker Theater, also known as Studebaker Hall, dedicated in 1898. In 1917, the theater underwent its first major renovation under the direction of architect Andrew Rebori. The theater looks much the same today as it did following the 1917 renovation, however the original ceiling from 1898 remains.

The Studebaker was the site of David Bispham's 1901 recital exclusively featuring the songs of Carrie Jacobs-Bond. Paul Whiteman and his orchestra gave the first public performance of the Grand Canyon Suite here on November 22, 1931. The venue also hosted some of the earliest live television shows including DuMont Television Network's Cavalcade of Stars hosted by comedian Jack Carter.

In the 1970s the theater was partitioned into a multiplex movie theater. Renovations to return to live theater were begun in 2015, and the theater was reopened in 2016, with a 740 seating capacity. 

A larger multimillion-dollar renovation began in 2021, updating many of the Studebaker's technical capacities. Following the renovation, the Studebaker Theater became home to NPR's Wait Wait... Don't Tell Me!

Chicago Little Theatre
From 1912 to 1917, the Fine Arts Building housed the Chicago Little Theatre, an art theater credited with beginning the Little Theatre Movement in the United States. Not being able to afford rental on the building's 500-seat auditorium, co-producers Maurice Browne and Ellen Van Volkenburg rented a large storage space on the fourth floor at the back and built it out into a 91-seat house. The group specialized in training actors and producing contemporary plays in their small 99-seat theater on the 4th floor, including performances of Shaw, Strindberg, Ibsen, Wilde, and Yeats. Though short-lived, the Chicago Little Theatre was a monumental influence on American theatre, spreading the Little Theatre practice across the nation and laying the groundwork for the Chicago storefront theater movement.

Prominent Historic Tenants 

 Lorado Taft, sculptor
 William W. Denslow, Wizard of Oz illustrator
 Frank Lloyd Wright, architect
 John T. McCutcheon, political cartoonist
 George Barr McCutcheon, author
 Ralph Fletcher Seymour, publisher and etcher
 Ralph Clarkson, portait painter
 Anna Morgan, acting teacher
 J.C. Leyendecker and F.X. Leyendecker, illustrators
 Oliver Dennett Grover, artist
 Frederic Clay Bartlett, artist
 Irving K. Pond, architect
 Caxton Club, literary club
 The Little Review, literary journal edited by Margaret Anderson
 Illinois Equal Suffrage Association
 Chicago Woman's Club
 Fortnightly of Chicago
 Chicago Youth Symphony Orchestras
 George Ade, humorist
 Henry Blake Fuller, novelist
 Kalo Shop, silversmithing shop
 Chicago Little Theatre, founded by Maurice Browne and Ellen Van Volkenburg
 The Dial, literary journal edited by Francis Fisher Browne
 Chicago Musical College
 Alliance Francaise
 George Hamlin, tenor
 Harrington Institute of Interior Design
 Studebaker Theatre Company (1956-1957), founded by Bernard Sahlins
 Jazz Institute of Chicago

References
Notes

External links

Fine Arts Building
After the Final Curtain (Pre-renovation photographs of the Studebaker Theatre
Studebaker Theater

Commercial buildings completed in 1885
Commercial buildings on the National Register of Historic Places in Chicago
Chicago Landmarks
Solon Spencer Beman buildings
Tourist attractions in Chicago
Art Nouveau architecture in Chicago
Art Nouveau commercial buildings
1885 establishments in Illinois